Pîtres (medieval Pistres) is a commune in the Eure department in Normandy in north-western France. It lies on the Seine.

History
Historically, it had a bridge to prevent Vikings from sailing up the river to Paris. It was here that King Charles the Bald promulgated the Edict of Pistres in 864.

Population

See also
Communes of the Eure department

References

Communes of Eure